Starrcade '92: Battlebowl – The Lethal Lottery II was the 10th annual Starrcade professional wrestling pay-per-view (PPV) event produced by World Championship Wrestling (WCW). It was broadcast December 28, 1992, from The Omni in Atlanta, Georgia.

The show's focus was the second-ever "Lethal Lottery" / "Battle Bowl" tournament, where randomly paired tag teams competed for a spot in the Battle Bowl battle royal at the end of the night. Unlike the previous Starrcade, it was only a 16-man tournament with 8 finalists in a single ring battle royal. It also saw Ron Simmons defend the WCW World Heavyweight Championship against "Dr. Death" Steve Williams; the team of Shane Douglas and Ricky Steamboat putting the WCW World Tag Team Championship on the line against the team of Brian Pillman and Barry Windham; and Masahiro Chono defend the NWA World Heavyweight Championship against The Great Muta. In addition, Sting faced off against Vader in the finals of the "King of Cable" tournament.

It was the last WCW Pay-Per-View for announcer Jim Ross, who left for the World Wrestling Federation (now WWE) shortly thereafter.

This was also the last Starrcade featuring championships from the National Wrestling Alliance, WCW would leave the NWA for good in September, 1993.

In 2001, WCW, including all rights to their television and pay-per-view shows, was bought by WWE. In 2014, all WCW pay-per-views were made available on the WWE Network.

Production

Background
From the 1960s to the 1980s, it was traditional for the National Wrestling Alliance (NWA) member Jim Crockett Promotions (JCP) to hold major professional wrestling events at Thanksgiving and Christmas, often at the Greensboro Coliseum in Greensboro, North Carolina in the center of JCP's Virginia, North and South Carolina territory. In 1983, JCP created Starrcade as their supercard to continue the Thanksgiving tradition, bringing in wrestlers from other NWA affiliates and broadcasting the show its territory on closed-circuit television. Starrcade soon became the flagship event of the year for JCP (later World Championship Wrestling, WCW), including their most important feuds and championship matches. In 1987 the show became available by nationwide pay-per-view as were all subsequent Starrcade shows. In 1988 JCP was sold to Ted Turner and by 1990 it was renamed World Championship Wrestling, continuing the Starrcade tradition. The 1992 event was the tenth show to use the Starrcade name and the fourth Starrcade to take place at The Omni in Atlanta, Georgia.

Storylines
The event featured wrestlers from pre-existing scripted feuds and storylines. Wrestlers portrayed villains, heroes, or less distinguishable characters in the scripted events that built tension and culminated in a wrestling match or series of matches.

The first match of the "Lethal Lottery" was drawn at random as part of the Clash of the Champions XXI show on November 18, 1992, which paired up Johnny B. Badd and Cactus Jack to face the team of Van Hammer and Danny Spivey, who won as part of the Starrcade show. Sting won the first BattleBowl at the 1991 Starrcade and thus was guaranteed to be one of the 16 wrestlers in the tournament.

Event

Ron Simmons was originally scheduled to defend the WCW World Heavyweight Championship against Rick Rude, but Rude was injured in the weeks prior to the show and had to be replaced by "Dr. Death" Steve Williams instead. The "King of Cable" tournament was an eight-man tournament conducted to celebrate the 20th anniversary of wrestling airing on TBS Superstation.

Reception
J.D. Dunn of 411Mania gave the event a rating of 5.0 [Not So Good], stating, "Bill Watts got fired almost immediately following this show, and Verne Gagne's coffee boy Eric Bischoff would take over and surprisingly not get fired himself after a dismal 1993. I appreciate that Watts tried to bring back realism and sportsmanship to WCW, but he booked to his tastes and not the audience when it came to who to push, and that came back to bite him. The show, like a lot of early 1990's WCW shows, had a hebetudinous pace and deathly atmosphere. The two matches worth seeing are on the Essential Starrcade, so no need to pick this one up.
Thumbs down."

Aftermath
Ron Simmons would lose the WCW World Heavyweight Championship two days later back to Big Van Vader in Baltimore, MD, the same site Simmons had defeated Vader on August 2.

Rick Rude appeared at the event distraught over being unable to challenge for the WCW World title and even more upset over WCW’s decision to strip him of the WCW United States Championship if he failed to defend by January 23, 1993. A tournament that was to begin the following month to determine a number one contender would eventually become a tournament final to determine a new champion, won by Dustin Rhodes. When Rude returned he would feud with Rhodes over the title. Rude’s next shot at a World title came at Fall Brawl '93: War Games, a match he had won.

Results

King of Cable Tournament brackets

References

Starrcade
Events in Atlanta
1992 in Georgia (U.S. state)
Professional wrestling in Atlanta
December 1992 events in the United States
1992 World Championship Wrestling pay-per-view events